Engineer Muhammad Hashim Ortaq, born , entered the Meshrano Jirga, the upper house of Afghanistan's National Assembly in 2005.
He represents Faryab Province.
He is a member of Junbish-e-Milli.

He has an engineering degree from Kabul University.

During the Soviet occupation of Afghanistan he was a senior security official in the Najibullah administration.

References

Members of the House of Elders (Afghanistan)
Living people
1955 births